Social Democratic Hungarian Civic Party (shortened form Soc Dems) was a Hungarian social-democratic political party, formed on 26 May 2013, and led by Andor Schmuck. This party claimed to be the legal successor to the Hungarian Social Democratic Party (MSZDP).

History
The party was founded as the Hungarian Social Democrats' Party.

References

2013 establishments in Hungary
2015 disestablishments in Hungary
Political parties established in 2013
Political parties disestablished in 2015
Social democratic parties in Hungary
Defunct political parties in Hungary
Social Democratic Party of Hungary
Opposition to Viktor Orbán